Winslow Township is an inactive township in Washington County, Arkansas, United States.

Winslow Township was established in 1884.

References

Townships in Washington County, Arkansas
Townships in Arkansas